Kursky (masculine), Kurskaya (feminine), or Kurskoye (neuter) is the name of several rural localities in Russia:
Kursky, Republic of Adygea, a khutor in Giaginsky District of the Republic of Adygea
Kursky, Novosibirsk Oblast, a settlement in Bagansky District of Novosibirsk Oblast
Kursky, Orenburg Oblast, a settlement in Marksovsky Selsoviet of Alexandrovsky District of Orenburg Oblast
Kurskoye, Belgorod Oblast, a selo in Starooskolsky District of Belgorod Oblast
Kurskoye, Kaliningrad Oblast, a settlement in Gvardeysky Rural Okrug of Bagrationovsky District of Kaliningrad Oblast
Kurskoye, Krasnoyarsk Krai, a selo in Kursky Selsoviet of Kuraginsky District of Krasnoyarsk Krai
Kurskoye, Primorsky Krai, a selo under the administrative jurisdiction of Lesozavodsk City Under Krai Jurisdiction, Primorsky Krai
Kurskoye, Tver Oblast, a village in Vyshnevolotsky District of Tver Oblast
Kurskaya, Kurgan Oblast, a village in Shchigrovsky Selsoviet of Mokrousovsky District of Kurgan Oblast
Kurskaya, Stavropol Krai, a stanitsa in Kursky Selsoviet of Kursky District of Stavropol Krai